Mor Nguer (born 9 November 1997) is a Senegalese football midfielder who last played for Slovakian Fortuna Liga club Pohronie.

Club career

FK Pohronie
Nguer made his Fortuna Liga debut for Pohronie in an away fixture against Tatran Liptovský Mikuláš, coming on as a half-time replacement for Ladji Mallé, with the score at 2:0 in favour of Tatran. Despite Miloš Lačný's goal in the 60th minute, Pohronie lost the game 5:1.

References

External links
 
 
 Futbalnet profile 

1997 births
Living people
People from Saint-Louis, Senegal
Senegalese footballers
Senegal youth international footballers
Association football midfielders
US Gorée players
Pau FC players
FK Pohronie players
Senegal Premier League
Championnat National players
Championnat National 3 players
Slovak Super Liga players
Expatriate footballers in Slovakia
Senegalese expatriate sportspeople in Slovakia